Niles is an unincorporated community in Benson County, North Dakota, United States.

References

Unincorporated communities in North Dakota
Populated places in Benson County, North Dakota